Zalisne, where  means behind and  a forest, may refer to several places in Ukraine:

Zalisne, Crimea
Zalisne, Donetsk Oblast
Zalisne, Luhansk Oblast
Zalisne, Sumy Oblast